Daniel Caine was a pseudonym of musician Derek Wadsworth.

See also
 Daniel Cane, entrepreneur
 Daniel Kane (linguist), an expert in Jurchen and Khitan languages
 Daniel Kane (mathematician)
 Dan Kane, investigative journalist